Annona reticulata is a small deciduous or semi-evergreen tree in the plant family Annonaceae and part of the Annonas group. It is best known for its fruit, called custard apple, a common name shared with fruits of several other species in the same genus: A. cherimola and A. squamosa. Other English common names include ox heart and bullock's heart. The fruit is sweet and useful in preparation of desserts, but is generally less popular for eating than that of A. cherimola.

Description

The yellow-green flowers are generally in clusters of three or four  to  diameter, with three long outer petals and three very small inner ones. Its pollen is shed as permanent tetrads.  

The fruits vary in shape, heart-shaped, spherical, oblong or irregular. When ripe, the fruit is brown or yellowish, with red highlights and a varying degree of reticulation, depending again on the variety. The flesh varies from juicy and very aromatic to hard with a repulsive taste. The flavor is sweet and pleasant, akin to the taste of 'traditional' custard.

Distribution and habitat

Possibly a native of the Caribbean and Central America, Annona reticulata is now pantropical. It grows from sea level to  altitude in areas of Central America that have alternating wet and dry seasons. It is cultivated and naturalized in many tropical places including Southeast Asia, Taiwan, India, Pakistan, Australia, and Africa. In India, the species has migrated from initial cultivation into the wild.

Climate 
Although the tree grows optimally in tropic conditions, it is also found in subtropical regions. It requires humid conditions (medium to high rainfall). Compared to the other Annonas, it is less drought tolerant. The annual temperature necessary ranges from 17 to 27 °C. It tolerates light night frosts to -2 °C. A. reticulata grows on many soil types with pH ranging from 5 to 8. It does not tolerate waterlogging or when the water table is too high.

Cultivation 
Seeds can be propagated. Other techniques for cultivation are grafting and budding. The tree produces 45 kg of fruits per year. In Asia, the season lasts from July to September, and in the Caribbean, it runs from February to April.

Uses

Food
Custard apple can be eaten raw, out of hand as a fresh fruit. It is not as popular as the sugar apple or the cherimoya. It can also be prepared as juices, ice-cream or puddings. In India, it is cooked into a sauce.

Propagation
A. reticulata may be grown in home gardens, even though it may not be as popular as the sugar apple (A. squamosa). It has value as rootstock for superior Annona species, such as the sugar apple, especially under humid conditions. It is also a genetic resource for hybridization.

Other
The leaves and the branches can be used for tanning as they contain blue pigments. Wrappers, ornaments and hats can be made from the inner bark. The wood is soft and can be used to make utensiles, even though, it is weak and of bad quality.

Nutrition 
In a 100 gram reference amount, custard apple supplies 101 calories, 23% of the Daily Value (DV) of vitamin C and 17% DV of vitamin B6, with no other micronutrients in significant amounts (table). Raw custard apple is 72% water, 25% carbohydrates, 2% protein, and 1% fat (table).

Risk and impact 
Annona reticulata is known to be an invasive plant. A PIER risk assessment gave a score of 11 for the Annona reticulata. It negatively impacts the population cultivating the crop as all parts of the tree (except the fruit) are toxic, possibly causing problems for human health.

Diseases and pests 
The diseases that can spread to Annona reticulata include the Anthracnose, the leaf spot, the diplodia rot and the black canker. The spiral nematode, the stunt nematode and the mealybug can also infect the plant

Aroma and phytochemicals
The fragrant aroma of A. reticulata results from some 180 compounds, including the volatile compounds, alpha-pinene, myrcene, and limonene, among others. The plant is rich in tannins.

Traditional medicine 
Various traditional medicine uses have been reported over centuries for its dried fruits, bark, or leaves.

References

External links

Custard apples (Annona spp.) by H. Mahdeem, 5 July 1998. 

reticulata
Trees of South America
Crops originating from South America
Tropical fruit
Plants described in 1753
Taxa named by Carl Linnaeus
Pantropical flora